Frankie is a British television drama series created by Lucy Gannon. The series stars Eve Myles as Frankie Maddox, a district nurse more emotionally involved with her job than her personal life. The series is both set and filmed in the English city of Bristol.

Overview
The series was first announced in May 2012 alongside three other new commissions for BBC One and BBC Three. Kate Harwood, the controller of drama series and serials for the corporation described the new drama commissions as "a tribute to the huge range of creativity and talent within the in-house drama teams in both London and Salford". An initial synopsis described the series as "a modern and redemptive" introspection of the life of a district nurse "whose patients matter more to her than her personal life". Further information was released in September in a BBC press release that described the aim of the series as "to build up a portrayal of the challenging, complex and ultimately life affirming world of district nursing". Writer and creator Lucy Gannon wrote that she was "thrilled to be writing about strong modern people [...] who all - whatever their flaws, are determined to make a difference, to make life better". The series is executive produced by Hilary Salmon, produced by Erika Hossington and directed by Mark Everest. It consists of six sixty-minute episodes, both set and filmed in the English city of Bristol. In July 2013, Gannon confirmed that the show would not be returning for a second series.

Cast
Eve Myles as Frankie Maddox the lead district nurse at the Community Nurse's Office
Dean Lennox Kelly as Ian Hargrave, Frankie's long-term boyfriend
Derek Riddell as Andy Peat
Jemma Redgrave as Doctor Zoe Evans, a partner in the Community Nurse's Office
Julia Ford as Mary McCloud
Leila Mimmack as Paula Simms
Noma Dumezweni as Angie Rascoe
Carla Henry as Karen Freestone
Ben Owen-Jones as Matthew Seren, the schedule coordinator

Eve Myles' casting in the titular role was announced in September 2012. Myles described Frankie as "a vibrant woman trying to live life in the fast lane and juggle a job" who is "an infectious character" insofar as she is "electric" and "quirky". Dean Lennox Kelly stars as Ian Hargrave, Frankie's long-term boyfriend, while Derek Riddell plays Andy Peat, a colleague and confidant. The cast also includes Jemma Redgrave as Dr Zoe Evans, Julia Ford as Mary McCloud, Leila Mimmack as Paula Simms, Noma Dumezweni as Angie Rascoe, and Carla Henry as Karen Freestone.

Episodes

References

External links
 
 

2013 British television series debuts
2013 British television series endings
2010s British drama television series
BBC high definition shows
BBC television dramas
2010s British medical television series
2010s British television miniseries
English-language television shows
Serial drama television series
Television shows shot in Bristol
Television shows set in Bristol